CROT may refer to:

 CROT (gene), which encodes the enzyme peroxisomal carnitine O-octanoyltransferase
 C-ROT gate, a component in quantum logic computers